Typhoon Sanba, known in the Philippines as Typhoon Karen, was the strongest tropical cyclone worldwide in 2012. The sixteenth named storm and tenth typhoon of the annual typhoon season, Sanba formed as a tropical depression east of the Philippines on September 10. The storm gradually intensified as it moved generally northward in an area favorable for tropical development. The system was soon upgraded to a tropical storm less than a day after formation and subsequently further to a typhoon on September 12. Later that day, Sanba entered a phase of explosive intensification, quickly strengthening and gaining annular characteristics. On September 13, the system attained its peak intensity with maximum sustained winds of 125 mph (205 km/h), and a barometric pressure of 900 mbar (hPa; 26.58 inHg), becoming the strongest typhoon in the Western Pacific Ocean since Megi in 2010. Accelerating towards more northerly latitudes, a period of gradual weakening ensued afterwards as its eye expanded. It made landfall on South Korea late on September 17 as a typhoon before transitioning into an extratropical cyclone the following day. Sanba's remnants tracked into the Primorsky Krai region of eastern Russia before they were last noted on September 19.

Passing just to the west of Japan, Sanba caused extensive losses to agriculture, forestry, and fishing industries on the islands of Okinawa Prefecture. Further inland on Kōchi and Gifu Prefectures, heavy rains damaged agricultural regions and washed out numerous roads. Losses on both prefectures totalled to ¥2.5 billion (US$31.8 million). Upon its landfall on the Korean Peninsula on September 17, it became the first time in 50 years that the peninsula had been struck by at least four typhoons in a single year. In South Korea, torrential rainfall also washed out road systems and inundated crop land, as well as damaged infrastructure. Losses there associated with Sanba totaled to ₩365.7 billion (US$328 million). In North Korea, the heavy precipitation worsened preexisting flood conditions initially started by Tropical Storm Khanun two months prior. In all, the typhoon killed six people and caused US$361 million in losses.

Meteorological history

A low-pressure area formed east of Palau on September 9 and gradually drifted westward. Early on September 10, the Japan Meteorological Agency (JMA) upgraded it to a tropical depression, before the Joint Typhoon Warning Center (JTWC) issued a Tropical Cyclone Formation Alert on the system later that day and also upgraded it to a tropical depression late on the same day, as Sanba started to become more organized, with the banding of thunderstorms strengthened, and wrapped more tightly into the low level circulation center .

As the system entered the Philippine Area of Responsibility early on September 11, the Philippine Atmospheric, Geophysical and Astronomical Services Administration (PAGASA) started to advisories on the system and named it Karen. At the same time, the JMA upgraded the system to a tropical storm and named it Sanba, and the JTWC also upgraded it to a tropical storm later.

On September 17, at 01:00 (UTC) Sanba made landfall over Korea.

Impact

Japan
In Kōchi Prefecture,  of agricultural land was damaged by the storm, with losses reaching ¥50 million (US$640,000). Throughout Okinawa, damage to agriculture, forestry, and fisheries amounted to ¥947 million (US$12.1 million). Heavy rains from the storm in Gifu Prefecture triggered numerous landslides and caused significant flooding that washed out hundreds of roads. Losses in the prefecture reached ¥1.5 billion (US$19.1 million).

South Korea
Across South Korea, heavy rains from the storm washed out numerous roads and flooded cropland. Numerous structures along rivers were damaged or destroyed by flooding. Across the nation, four people were killed and the damage from the typhoon reached ₩365.7 billion (US$328 million).

Russia
The extratropical remnants of Sanba brought flooding to Primorsky Krai. Preliminary losses over the region were estimated to be ₽40 million (US$1.29 million).

See also

Other tropical cyclones named Sanba
Typhoon Saomai (2000)
Typhoon Rusa (2002)
Typhoon Maemi (2003)
Typhoon Vongfong (2014)
Typhoon Hinnamnor (2022)

Notes

References

External links

JMA General Information of Typhoon Sanba (1216) from Digital Typhoon
JMA Best Track Data of Typhoon Sanba (1216) 
JTWC Best Track Data of Super Typhoon 17W (Sanba)
17W.SANBA from the U.S. Naval Research Laboratory
Radar animations of Sanba (courtesy Brian McNoldy, RSMAS/Univ of Miami)

2012 Pacific typhoon season
2012 disasters in South Korea
2012 disasters in Russia
Typhoons in Japan
Typhoons in South Korea
Typhoons in North Korea
Typhoons in Russia
Typhoons in Palau
Typhoons
2012 in Palau
Sanba